Saltash (Cornish: Essa) is a town and civil parish in south Cornwall, England, United Kingdom. It had a population of 16,184 in 2011 census. Saltash faces the city of Plymouth over the River Tamar and is popularly known as "the Gateway to Cornwall". Saltash’s landmarks include the Tamar Bridge which connects Plymouth to Cornwall by road, and the Royal Albert Bridge. The area of Latchbrook is part of the town.

Description

Saltash is the location of Isambard Kingdom Brunel's Royal Albert Bridge, opened by Prince Albert on 2 May 1859. It takes the railway line across the River Tamar. Alongside it is the Tamar Bridge, a toll bridge carrying the A38 trunk road, which in 2001 became the first suspension bridge to be widened whilst remaining open to traffic.

Saltash railway station, which has a regular train service, with some routes between London Paddington station is close to the town centre.

Stagecoach South West and Go Cornwall Bus operate bus services from Saltash, into Plymouth, Launceston, Liskeard, Looe, Polperro, Padstow, and Torpoint.

The grade II listed cottage of Mary Newman, the mistress of Sir Francis Drake, is situated on Cuvier Road.

Nearby are the castles at Trematon and Ince, as well as the nature reserve at Churchtown Farm. Burrell House near Saltash was built in 1621 and has a wing dated 1636. The entrance side was altered in the 18th century.

The town expanded in the 1990s with the addition of the large new estate Latchbrook, and again with the more recent building of another housing area, Pillmere. In the summer of 2009, the Saltash postcode area was judged as the most desirable place to live in Great Britain in a survey that included statistics from school results and crime figures.

History

Toponymy
The Charter of Incorporation refers to the place as 'Essa' (Latin for 'Ash'). However, the spelling of the town has changed over the years. For example, in Edward the Confessor's time, it was called and spelt 'Aysche'. In the 1584 Charter, it is stated that Essa is now commonly called Saltash. A family called Essa lived in the twelfth century at their property near Ashtor Rock, where the Manor Courts were once held. The 'Salt' part of the name was added to distinguish it from other places called Ash.

Early history

Roger de Valletort (Reginald de Valle Torta) sold out in 1270 to Richard, Earl of Cornwall and King of the Romans while Edward, the Black Prince, became the first Duke of Cornwall, and a visitor to Trematon Castle.

in 1549 there was a Cornish insurrection against the introduction of the Protestant liturgy, and the rebels under Humphrey Arundell, for which he was beheaded at Tyburn, gained possession of Trematon Castle by treachery, capturing Sir Richard Grenville, the elder, in the process. They then carried out acts of barbarity on their surprised visitors.

The arms of Saltash are Az. the base water proper in pale an escutcheon Or thereon a lion rampant Gu. within a bordure Sa. bezantee ensigned with a prince's coronet of the third on either side of the escutcheon an ostrich feather Arg. labelled Or. There are seals of Saltash: A three-masted ship with sails furled at anchor; and An escutcheon charges with a lion rampant within a bordure bezantee resting upon water surmounted by a coronet composed on crosses patee and fleurs-de-lis and either side an ostrich feather; with the legends "Sigillum aquate Saltash" and "Sigillum Saltashe" respectively. Saltash Guildhall was built in about 1780 and extended and restored in 1925.

Saltash Ferry

The history of Saltash is linked to the passage, or ferrying place across the Tamar. The original ferry became established by fishermen for those passing to and from the monastery at St Germans and to Trematon Castle.

After the Norman Conquest, Robert, Count of Mortain, who held the castle and manor at Trematon, took the market from the canons at St. Germans and established it at Saltash. The Count granted Trematon and other manors to the de Valletorts, who had then to provide for the ferry boat. In the twelfth century a borough was founded (1190), and Saltash became the only franchised seaport between Dartmouth and Fowey. This fact has given rise to the Saltash saying, Saltash was a borough town, when Plymouth was a fuzzy down ('fuzzy' = 'fursy' i.e. covered in gorse), as the town of Plymouth and its seaport did not exist in 1190. In medieval times the ferry was part of the manor of Trematon, held by the Valletorts.

Antony Passage Ferry

The Antony Passage Ferry, which is mentioned in documents as early as 1324, was situated within the St Stephens suburb of Saltash civil parish.
The ferry belonged to the Daunay family in the 14th Century, in 1450 it passed to the Carew family, and by the end of the 18th century it was taken over by the Crosley family, who operated the ferry for several generations until it fell into disuse in the early 1950s.  The route linked Jupiter Point (part of the Antony Estate), Antony Passage and Passage Point (both part of Saltash).

Officially the Antony Passage Ferry is still in existence since, as a public ferry, an Act of Parliament would be necessary to terminate it, and it still appears on Ordnance Survey maps.

Parish churches

The parish church of Saltash was, until 1881, St Stephen's by Saltash, one mile from the town. Though of earlier foundation, the structure of the building is largely the 15th century: there are two aisles and the tower is west of the north aisle. The font is Norman.

This church was probably founded in Norman times by the lords of Trematon Castle. Like the castle it belonged later to the Earls and Dukes of Cornwall; in 1351 King Edward III appropriated it to the Deanery of Windsor so that the benefice became a vicarage. In medieval times there was a chapel at Saltash and private chapels at Shillingham ((1318), Trehan ((1332), Earth (1413) and Trevalward (1395). The chapel at Saltash was dedicated to Saint Nicholas and Saint Faith and became the parish church of the town in 1881.

St. Nicholas & St. Faith's Church has an unbuttressed tower adjoining the former north transept which remains from the original Norman church. The blocked south door is Norman, as is; most of the masonry of the chancel, the nave, the south transept, and the west wall. A north chancel chapel was added in the 14th century. In the 15th century, a north aisle was added to the nave; the wagon roofs of the north aisle and the nave are of the same date. The font is probably Norman and is of an unusual vague shape. There is a monument to three naval officers, John and James Drew, and J. W. Drew, who were drowned in 1798 and 1799.

Education

Primary schools in Saltash include Burraton CP School, Bishop Cornish (V.A) Primary School, Brunel School (previously Longstone Infant School and Saltash Junior School) and St Stephens School, St Germans CP School

The secondary school in Saltash was designated as a Science and Mathematics & Computing Specialist College in September 2004, and renamed Saltash.net community school. The school is now known as Saltash Community School.

Cornwall College has a campus in Saltash.

Festivals
Saltash hosts a number of annual festivals: Saltash Mayfair takes place in and around Fore Street during early May, and Saltash Town Regatta brings music and entertainment to the Waterside area in the summer. On the water there are intense Gig races with the best teams taking part, along with Flashboat rowing and dinghy racing, and the now infamous 'England and back' race between local organisations. For 2008 a new five towns challenge has been added to the list of events, pitting Saltash against Liskeard, Callington, Looe and Torpoint. Ashore you will find many stalls, music, and marquees. See the Regatta and Mayfair websites listed below for more information.

Health services
The local cottage hospital (the Home of St Barnabas (convalescent) ) was provided by the Society of Saint Margaret, an Anglican sisterhood. More recently it has been part of the National Health Service and was operated by Peninsula Community Health for a number of years.

Notable residents

Sir Evan Nepean 1st Bt was born in St Stephens near Saltash in 1752.
George Carter Bignell, the eminent entomologist, lived on Home Park Road until his death in 1910. A large collection of his insect specimens is held at the Plymouth Museum.
Dame Moura Lympany the pianist was born in Saltash in 1916.
Ann Glanville, born 1796; champion gig rower who lived all her life in Saltash.
Colin Sullivan (footballer), born 1951; former football player for Plymouth Argyle, born in Saltash. He is considered the best left-back to ever play for the club, inducted into the all-time best XI in 2004.

Sport and leisure 

Saltash is home to Saltash United F.C. who play in the Western Football League, at the ninth tier of the English football league system. The town is also home to Caradon Pilot Gig Rowing Club.

Livewire Youth Project, a music-themed youth club, is located on the banks of the River Tamar. The club boasts a recording studio, band practice rooms, and a 300-person capacity music venue. Well known bands such as The Damned and The Hoosiers have played at the project. Social, romantic and sexual health advice and support is offered by Livewire as well.

A cycling club is situated at Tamar view industrial estate. Regular rides take place throughout the year. The cycling club has all levels and abilities.

Saltash Leisure centre provides a leisure pool, gym and fitness facilities. Not far to the north is the China Fleet Country Club which has an 18-hole championship standard golf course, a swimming pool with spa and other fitness facilities.

The Saltash Sailing Club caters for all ages with over 100 cadets out on the water on a Friday night. There are dinghy races on Tuesday and yacht races on Thursday. And additional activities organised for those less competitive.

A BMX and skatepark are available in the Saltmill Park along with pieces of public art. Saltmill is also home to an all-weather pitch available to local organisations.

Saltash Tennis Centre, which is located behind the Leisure centre. The tennis centre consists of two grass courts and two hard courts, along with a clubhouse with male and female changing. The club currently has three men's team in the Plymouth and District league (P&D league) and a women's team in the associative ladies P&D league. The club also has two junior teams in the U19 P&D leagues.

Local attractions 

 Cotehele House (National Trust)
 St. Mellion International Resort
 Royal Albert Bridge
 Tamar Bridge
 Churchtown Farm Nature Reserve

Other references to Saltash
There have been both real and fictitious Royal Navy ships named HMS Saltash. "Saltash" is also a popular traditional Cornish tune. At Brunel University, Uxbridge, one of the halls of residence is named Saltash because of Brunel's Royal Albert Bridge. British saxophonist John Surman's 2012 album (produced by ECM) is named Saltash Bells.

References

Bibliography
 Vosper, Douglas C. (1968). A Glimpse of Saltash. Liskeard: Snell & Cowling.

External links

 Saltash Town Council
 Online Catalogue for Saltash at the Cornwall Record Office
 

Civil parishes in Cornwall
Cornish Killas
Populated coastal places in Cornwall
Towns in Cornwall